Dylan James Tippetts is a British Labour Co-operative politician who has served as councillor for Compton in Plymouth since 2022. He is Plymouth City Council's first openly transgender councillor and one of the first trans councillors in the UK.

Early life 
Dylan Tippetts was born in Taunton in Somerset on 2 December 2000, and grew up in Bridgwater. He came out as transgender in 2018, and moved to Plymouth shortly after. He is a law student.

Political career 
Tippetts stood as the Labour Co-operative candidate for Compton ward in the 2022 Plymouth City Council election. He won the seat, becoming the ward's first Labour councillor. His election also saw him become the first trans councillor in the city. Speaking about winning the seat, he said:“If I can help someone realise that trans people are just normal human beings like everyone else, with the same hopes and dreams, (and) just help dial down some of the real hate and division at the moment, that would be incredible. It would be even more of an honour to show a young person who might be scared of coming out that everything’s going to be OK and everything that they want in life can come true.”

Personal life 
Tippetts lives in Mutley Plain in Plymouth.

References 

English LGBT politicians
Transgender politicians
2000 births
Living people
Politicians from Plymouth, Devon
People from Bridgwater
Labour Party (UK) councillors